Klépierre S.A. is a French real estate investment trust (REIT) and Europe’s second-biggest publicly traded mall operator.

It was founded in 1990. It focuses on the ownership, management and development of shopping centers across Continental Europe.

The company’s largest shareholders are Simon Property Group, which owns 20.3% of the shares, and APG (13.1%), a Netherlands-based pension fund. Klepierre shares are listed on Euronext Paris and is a member of the CAC Next 20 index of French companies.

In July 2014, Klépierre offered to buy Dutch competitor Corio. The deal was completed on March 31, 2015. Through this transaction Klépierre acquired a 7.0 billion euro shopping center portfolio with strategic positions in the Netherlands, France, Italy, Germany, Spain and Turkey.

Portfolio

Shopping centres
In 2017, the company had 150 shopping centres worth €23.8 billion. It has a presence in 16 countries, mostly in Europe, with 1.2 billion visitors to its shopping centres each year. The company focuses on urban centers that are going through rapid demographic change and that are well integrated with local infrastructure.

References

External links

Real estate companies of France
CAC Next 20
Companies listed on Euronext Paris
Real estate companies established in 1990
Companies based in Paris
Shopping center management firms
1990 establishments in France